Female Agents is a 2008 French historical drama film directed by Jean-Paul Salomé and starring Sophie Marceau, Julie Depardieu, Marie Gillain, Déborah François, and Moritz Bleibtreu. Written by Salomé and Laurent Vachaud, the film is about female resistance fighters in the Second World War. Jean-Paul Salomé, the director, drew inspiration from an obituary in The Times newspaper of Lise de Baissac (Lise Villameur), from Mauritius (then a British colony), one of the heroines of the SOE, named "Louise Desfontaines" in the film and played by Sophie Marceau. The film was partly funded by BBC Films.

Plot
In May 1944 Louise Desfontaines (Sophie Marceau), a member of the French Resistance, flees to Spain after her husband is killed, where she is captured and later expatriated to London. She is recruited by the Special Operations Executive (SOE), the secret spy and sabotage service initiated by Winston Churchill. Louise is given an urgent first mission: to extricate a British agent (Conrad Cecil) who has fallen into German hands while preparing the invasion of Normandy. The agent has not yet revealed anything but time is pressing.

Louise must first create a commando group of women especially chosen for the needs of the operation. When it comes to recruitment, anything goes: lies, blackmail, bribery (through the offer of remission of a death sentence) and calls to carry out patriotic duty. She first employs Suzy Desprez (Marie Gillain), a cabaret dancer who excels in the art of seducing men. Then she brings in Gaëlle Lemenech (Déborah François), a chemist and explosives expert. Finally she selects Jeanne Faussier (Julie Depardieu), a prostitute capable of killing in cold blood. After their arrival in Normandy, they are joined by Maria Luzzato (Maya Sansa), an Italian Jew and radio operator.

The mission gets under way well, but quickly becomes complicated. They are obliged to return to Paris, where the SOE gives them a new, almost suicidal, objective: to eliminate Colonel Heindrich, one of the key figures of Nazi counter-espionage. He knows too much about the planned landings.

Cast

 Sophie Marceau as Louise Desfontaines
 Julie Depardieu as Jeanne Faussier
 Marie Gillain as Suzy Desprez
 Déborah François as Gaëlle Lemenech
 Moritz Bleibtreu as SS-Standartenführer Karl Heindrich
 Maya Sansa as Maria Luzzato
 Julien Boisselier as Pierre Desfontaines
 Vincent Rottiers as Eddy
 Volker Bruch as SS-Obersturmführer Becker
 Robin Renucci as Melchior
 Xavier Beauvois as Claude Granville
 Colin David Reese as Colonel Maurice Buckmaster
 Jurgen Mash as Generalfeldmarshall Gerd von Rundstedt
 Conrad Cecil as Le géologue anglais
 Alexandre Jazede as René Bourienne
 David Capelle as Bernard Quesnot
 Wolfgang Pissors as Médecin train
 Chantal Garrigues as Mme Duchemin
 James Gerard as Officier anglais 1
 Edward Hamilton-Clark as Officier anglais 2
 Marc Bertolini as Moustachu train
 Rainer Sievert as Lieutenant hôpital Normandie
 Ashley Wanninger as Soldat radio cour hôpital
 Natasha Cashman as Secrétaire Buckmaster
 Stanislas Kemper as Pilote Jeanne RAF
 Simon Boyle as Dispatcher
 Olivier De Wispelaere as Feld gendarme St Lazare
 Johannes Oliver Hamm as Major SS train
 David Van Severen as Caporal Pioche
 Sarah Tullamore as Nurse hôpital anglais
 Philippe Soutan as Poinçonneur Baratier
 Yves Heck as Conducteur métro
 Stéphane Foenkinos as Contrôleur train
 Christophe Grofer as Sentinelle G2
 Stefan Kollmuss as Officier Wehrmacht St Germain
 Fabian Arning as Soldat Pierre
 Olivier Beraud-Bedouin as Le milicien (as Olivier Beraud)
 Alex Lutz as a Soldier
 Jan Oliver Schroeder as Garde entrée hôpital
 Serge Boutleroff as Concierge hôtel Régent (as Serge Onteniente)
 Antoine Salomé as Groom Régent
 Andrew W. Wilson as Prêtre catholique aérodrome
 Ida Techer as La surveillante couloir

Reception
While the film received general positive reviews from French critics, certain resistance veterans from the time have criticised it saying it portrayed them as "coerced into joining the resistance", not joining through patriotism.

The film won the Radio-Canada Audience Award at the 2010 edition of the Cinéfranco film festival.

References

External links
 
 
 
 
 Female Agents at uniFrance

2008 films
2000s spy films
2000s adventure films
2000s French-language films
French war films
French spy films
War adventure films
World War II films based on actual events
Films about the French Resistance
Films set in the 1940s
Films directed by Jean-Paul Salomé
Films scored by Bruno Coulais
2000s French films